John K. Dutton (11 June 1909 – 21 April 1985) was a British trade union leader.

Dutton began his working life in a socialist bookshop.  During World War II, he served with the London Fire Brigade, and became active in the Fire Brigades Union.

In 1949, Dutton began working for the Association of Scientific Workers (AScW), and two years later he was appointed the union's deputy general secretary.  He was elected as general secretary of the union in 1955.

Clive Jenkins was elected as secretary of the Association of Supervisory Staffs, Executives and Technicians in 1960, and Dutton began negotiating a merger between the two unions.  This was completed in 1969, forming the Association of Scientific, Technical and Managerial Staffs, with Dutton and Jenkins as joint general secretaries.  Dutton retired in 1970, but became general secretary of the World Federation of Scientific Workers (WFSW).  In 1985, he visited Moscow as part of his WSFW role, and died while he was there.

References

1909 births
1985 deaths
Civil Defence Service personnel
General secretaries of British trade unions
Trade unionists from London